The 1987–88 Iowa State Cyclones men's basketball team represented Iowa State University during the 1987–88 NCAA Division I men's basketball season. The Cyclones were coached by Johnny Orr, who was in his 8th season. They played their home games at Hilton Coliseum in Ames, Iowa.

They finished the season 20–12, 6–8 in Big Eight play to finish in 5th place. They earned an at-large bid to the NCAA tournament as the #12 seed in the East region. The Cyclones lost to Georgia Tech in the opening round of the tournament.

Roster

Schedule and results 

|-
!colspan=6 style=""|Regular Season

|-
!colspan=12 style=""|Big Eight tournament

|-
!colspan=9 style=""|NCAA Tournament

|-

Rankings

References 

Iowa State Cyclones men's basketball seasons
Iowa State
Iowa State
Iowa State Cyc
Iowa State Cyc